"Happy New Year" is a holiday greeting.

Happy New Year may also refer to:

Film
 La bonne année, also known as Happy New Year, a 1973 French film directed by Claude Lelouch
 Happy New Year (1987 film), an American remake of the 1973 French film, directed by John G. Avildsen
 Happy New Year (2008 film), a Swiss film
 Happy New Year (2014 film), a Bollywood action drama by Farah Khan
 Happy New Year (2017 film), an Indian Kannada language film
 I Love New Year, a 2015 Hindi film with the working title Happy New Year
 A Year-End Medley, a 2021 South Korean film with native name as Happy New Year

Music
 Happy New Year (musical), a 1980 adaptation of the Philip Barry play Holiday
 Happy New Year (album), a 2006 album by brooklyn based Alternative Rock/Indie Rock/Krautrock/Psychedelic rock band Oneida
 Happy New Year (Violent Femmes EP)
 "Happy New Year" (song), a song by Swedish pop group ABBA on their 1980 album Super Trouper, also recorded by A*Teens
 "Happy New Year", a song by Dido from her 2013 album Girl Who Got Away
 "Happy New Year!", an episode of season 4 of Phineas and Ferb